TRAF3-interacting JNK-activating modulator is a protein that in humans is encoded by the TRAF3IP3 gene.

Model organisms

Model organisms have been used in the study of TRAF3IP3 function. A conditional knockout mouse line, called Traf3ip3tm1a(KOMP)Wtsi was generated as part of the International Knockout Mouse Consortium program—a high-throughput mutagenesis project to generate and distribute animal models of disease to interested scientists.

Male and female animals underwent a standardized phenotypic screen to determine the effects of deletion. Twenty three tests were carried out on homozygous mutant mice and two significant abnormalities were observed. Males had a decrease in white blood cell count and females had an increased susceptibility to bacterial infection.

Interactions 

TRAF3IP3 has been shown to interact with STRN, MOBKL3, STK24 and FAM40A.

References

Further reading 

 
 
 
 
 

Genes mutated in mice